Empalme Olmos is a village in the Canelones Department of southern Uruguay.

Empalme Olmos is also the name of the municipality to which the town belongs.

Geography

Location

History
Its status was elevated to "Pueblo" (village) on 3 November 1952 by the Act of Ley Nº 11.877.

Population
In 2011 Empalme Olmos had a population of 4,199. In 2010, the Intendencia de Canelones had recorded a population of 5,497 for the municipality during the elections.

 
Source: Instituto Nacional de Estadística de Uruguay

Places of worship
 St. Rose of Lima Parish Church (Roman Catholic)

References

Images

External links

INE map of Empalme Olmos, Olmos, La Montañesa and Piedra del Toro

Populated places in the Canelones Department